Daw is a given name. Notable people with the name include:

 Daw Meskine, French Imam and Secretary General of the French Council for Imams
 Daw Penjo, Bhutanese diplomat
 Daw Kyan (1918–2019), Burmese historian and writer
 Daw Ohn (1913–2003), 20th-century Burmese activist, scholar, and professor

See also 
 Daw (disambiguation)
 Daw (surname)